The Germany cricket team toured Belgium in May 2019 to play three Twenty20 International (T20I) matches. These were the first T20I fixtures to be played by both teams, after the International Cricket Council announced that all matches played between Associate Members after 1 January 2019 would have full T20I status. The series took place at the Royal Brussels Cricket Club in Waterloo, just south of Brussels, with Germany using the fixtures as part of their preparation for the European Regional Qualifying tournament for the 2019 ICC T20 World Cup Qualifier.

Squads

T20I series

1st T20I

2nd T20I

3rd T20I

References

External links
 Series home at ESPN Cricinfo

2019 in German cricket
2019 in Belgian cricket
Associate international cricket competitions in 2019